Bang Krang is one of the ten subdistricts (tambon) of Mueang Nonthaburi District, in Nonthaburi Province, Thailand. Neighbouring subdistricts are (from north clockwise) Bang Rak Noi, Sai Ma, Bang Si Mueang, Bang Si Thong, Bang Khanun, Bang Khun Kong, Bang Khu Wiang and Bang Len. In 2020 it had a total population of 31,954 people.

Administration

Central administration
The subdistrict is subdivided into 10 administrative villages (muban).

Local administration
The area of the subdistrict is shared by two local administrative organizations.
Bang Krang Town Municipality
Bang Si Mueang Town Municipality

References

External links
Website of Bang Krang Town Municipality
Website of Bang Si Mueang Town Municipality

Tambon of Nonthaburi province
Populated places in Nonthaburi province